Delias fasciata is a butterfly in the family Pieridae. It was described by Walter Rothschild in 1894. It is found in the Australasian realm. It is endemic to Sumba.

The wingspan is about 60–63 mm. Adults are similar to Delias periboea, but may be distinguished by having a more extended yellow area, and by having the black distal border unbroken.

References

External links
Delias at Markku Savela's Lepidoptera and Some Other Life Forms

fasciata
Butterflies described in 1894